John Latham publishes A General Synopsis of Birds (1781–1801)
Jacques Barraband is commissioned to produce a series of watercolours of birds by Napoleon Bonaparte.
Jean Baptiste Bory de Saint-Vincent spends two years exploring Réunion and other islands in the Indian Ocean.
 Birds described in 1801 include the Norfolk Island ground-dove, the Puerto Rican emerald, the bell miner  the pallid cuckoo and the purple swamphen
The green mango hummingbird described by Louis Jean Pierre Vieillot and Jean Baptiste Audebert in Oiseaux dorés, ou à reflets métalliques
 Naturhistorische Gesellschaft Nürnberg (Natural History Society of Nuremberg founded.  The society's museum is Naturhistorische Gesellschaft Nürnberg e. V.

Birding and ornithology by year
1801 in science